The 2013–14 Presbyterian Blue Hose men's basketball team represented Presbyterian College during the 2013–14 NCAA Division I men's basketball season. The Blue Hose, led by 25th year head coach Gregg Nibert, played their home games at the Templeton Physical Education Center and were members of the South Division of the Big South Conference. They finished the season 6–26, 2–14 in Big South play to finish in last place in the South Division. They lost in the first round of the Big South tournament to Radford.

Roster

Schedule

|-
!colspan=9 style="background:#0060AA; color:#A80436;"| Regular season

|-
!colspan=9 style="background:#0060AA; color:#A80436;"| Big South tournament

References

Presbyterian Blue Hose men's basketball seasons
Presbyterian